Conic Island or Fan Tsang Chau is a small uninhabited island in Sai Kung District, Hong Kong.

Its Chinese name derives from it being in the shape of Zeng, a crockery used in ancient times in steaming rice.

There is a small lighthouse  and a basic dock on the island.

Location
Located within Sai Kung East Country Park, the island lies a few hundred metres east of Tsang Pang Kok, Long Ke Wan. It is visible from Tsang Pang Kok, the East Dam of the High Island Reservoir, the eastern end of Man Yee Road as well as at the end of Stage 1 of the MacLehose Trail.

Conservation
Conic Island is part of the High Island Special Area, which covers 3.9 hectares and was designated in 2011. The area includes the two islands Po Pin Chau and Conic Island and no part of High Island proper. The geology of the area is characterised by volcanic rocks of the Cretaceous period.

References

Further reading
 
 

Uninhabited islands of Hong Kong
Sai Kung District
Islands of Hong Kong